Roy Lee Hamilton (born July 20, 1957) is an American former professional basketball player who played in the National Basketball Association (NBA) who is currently a coordinating producer for Fox Sports Net. He played college basketball at the University of California, Los Angeles (UCLA) from 1975 to 1979. He was drafted in the first round as the 10th overall pick in the 1979 NBA draft by the Detroit Pistons. He played one season with the Pistons and another with the Portland Trail Blazers. He briefly played in the Continental Basketball Association before pursuing another dream of working on sports television. He thought the odds of his return to the NBA were slim after having already been cut, and did not want to become "bitter and disappointed".

Hamilton became a television commentator for UCLA in the 1982–83 season. He started in an entry-level broadcast position for CBS Sports in New York and later became one of CBS's top National Football League (NFL) producers. When the network lost their NFL contract to Fox in 1993, he joined Fox along with some other CBS personnel. As of 2001, Hamilton was one of the highest-ranking African Americans working on sports television production as Fox Sports Net's coordinating producer of college football and regional NBA coverage. He also oversaw Fox's Sunday coverage of Atlantic Coast Conference basketball.

References

1957 births
Living people
All-American college men's basketball players
American men's basketball players
Basketball players from Los Angeles
Detroit Pistons draft picks
Detroit Pistons players
Point guards
Portland Trail Blazers players
UCLA Bruins men's basketball players
Verbum Dei High School alumni